The Canon EOS R3 is a 24 megapixel full-frame mirrorless interchangeable-lens camera launched by Canon officially announced by Canon on 14 September 2021 alongside two RF mount lenses. The camera is available as body only with a MSRP of US$5,999.00. 

The camera marks the return of eye-controlled autofocus, a feature not seen in a Canon camera since the Canon EOS-3 in 1998.

Even though the camera was not officially released to the public, it was already used at the 2020 Summer Olympics in Japan.

The EOS R3 won Camera Grand Prix 2022 Editors Choice Technology Award.

In July 2022, EOS R3 firmware update 1.2.0, enabled this camera to shoot up to 50 frames at a custom high-speed continuous mode rate of 195 frames per second with full resolution in JPEG, HEIF or RAW format.

Features 
 24.1-megapixel Back-illuminated stacked CMOS sensor: highspeed read-out image sensor designed to reduce rolling shutter
 Autofocus vehicle recognition and tracking
 “Eye Control AF“: The focus point can be set by looking at it in the viewfinder
 Multi-Function Shoe: A new hotshoe design compatible with a variety of accessories including an XLR microphone adapter
 Magnesium alloy with a built-in vertical grip
 Weather and dust resistance equivalent to EOS-1D camera models
 Dual card slots (CFexpress and UHS-II SD memory cards)
 DIGIC X image processor
 In-camera image stabilization for up to 8 stops
 6K 60p internal raw video, downsampled 4K videos with Canon Log3 profile
 electronic viewfinder and vari-angle LCD touchscreen
 Wired LAN and 5GHz Wi-Fi connectivity

See also 
 Canon EOS R
 Canon EOS R5
 Canon EOS R1

References 

Canon RF-mount cameras
Full-frame mirrorless interchangeable lens cameras